The 1986 Kansas Jayhawks football team represented the University of Kansas in the Big Eight Conference during the 1986 NCAA Division I-A football season. In their first season under head coach Bob Valesente, the Jayhawks compiled a 3–8 record (0–7 against conference opponents), tied for last place in the conference, and were outscored by opponents by a combined total of 327 to 112. They played their home games at Memorial Stadium in Lawrence, Kansas.

The team's statistical leaders included Mike Orth with 1,548 passing yards, Arnold Snell with 672 rushing yards, and Ronnie Caldwell with 423 receiving yards. Phil Forte, Mike Orth, Paul Oswald, Wayne Ziegler, and John Randolph were the team captains.

Schedule

References

Kansas
Kansas Jayhawks football seasons
Kansas Jayhawks football